ISO 3166-2:LK is the entry for Sri Lanka in ISO 3166-2, part of the ISO 3166 standard published by the International Organization for Standardization (ISO), which defines codes for the names of the principal subdivisions (e.g., provinces or states) of all countries coded in ISO 3166-1.

Currently for Sri Lanka, ISO  codes are defined for two levels of subdivisions:
 9 provinces
 25 districts

Each code consists of two parts, separated by a hyphen. The second part is either of the following:
 one digit (1–9): provinces
 two digits: districts

For the districts, the first digit is the second part of the ISO  code of the province where the district is in.

Current codes
Subdivision names are listed as in the ISO  standard published by the ISO 3166 Maintenance Agency (ISO 3166/MA).

ISO 639-1 codes are used to represent subdivision names in the following administrative languages:
 (si): Sinhalese
 (ta): Tamil
 (en): English

Click on the button in the header to sort each column.

Provinces

Districts

Changes
The following changes to the entry have been announced in newsletters by the ISO 3166/MA since the first publication of ISO  in 1998. ISO stopped issuing newsletters in 2013.

The following changes to the entry are listed on ISO's online catalogue, the Online Browsing Platform:

See also
 Subdivisions of Sri Lanka
 FIPS region codes of Sri Lanka

External links
 ISO Online Browsing Platform: LK
 Provinces of Sri Lanka, Statoids.com

2:LK
ISO 3166-2
ISO 3166-2
Sri Lanka geography-related lists